Welsh national identity is a term referring to the sense of national identity, as embodied in the shared and characteristic culture, languages and traditions, of the Welsh people.

History

Celtic era 

The Celtic Britons or Ancient Britons were the Celtic people who inhabited Great Britain from at least the British Iron Age and into the Middle Ages, at which point they diverged into the Welsh, Cornish and Bretons (among others). They spoke the Common Brittonic language, the ancestor of the modern Brittonic languages.

Archaeologists generally agree that the majority of the British Isles were inhabited by Celts before the Roman invasion, organized into many tribes. The area now known as Wales had no political or social unity and Romans did not give the area as a whole any distinctive name.  Northern Wales and southern Wales have some notable cultural differences before the Roman invasion, and should not be considered one entity.

Resistance to Roman rule 
The Roman conquest of what is now known as Wales began in AD 48 and took 30 years to complete; the occupation lasted over 300 years. The most famous of resistance was led by Caradog of the Celtic Catuvellauni tribe (modern day Essex), which were defeated by the Romans. Now leading the Celtic tribes of the Ordovices and Silures, Caradog led a successful guerilla war against the Romans. His armies were eventually defeated at the Battle of Caer Caradog in AD 50.
Anglesey was swelling with migrants fleeing from the Romans, and it had become a stronghold for the Druids. Despite the Romans initial fear and superstition of Anglesey, they were able to achieve victory and subdue the tribes there. However, this victory was short lived and a massive British rebellion led by Boudica erupted in the east and interrupted the consolidation of Wales. Only one tribe was left mostly intact throughout the conquest - the Demetae of what is now west Wales. This tribe did not oppose Rome, and developed peacefully, isolated from its neighbours and the Roman Empire.

The Welsh national identity according to some, emerged in the year 383 when the Roman general Magnus Maximus left Wales. Early historians, including the 6th-century cleric Gildas, have noted 383 as a significant point in Welsh history. In that year, the Roman general Magnus Maximus, or Macsen Wledig, stripped Britain of troops to launch a successful bid for imperial power, continuing to rule Britain from Gaul as emperor, and transferring power to local leaders. The earliest Welsh genealogies cite Maximus as the founder of several royal dynasties, and as the father of the Welsh Nation. He is given as the ancestor of a Welsh king on the Pillar of Eliseg, erected nearly 500 years after he left Britain, and he figures in lists of the Fifteen Tribes of Wales.

Early Middle Ages 
After the Roman departure in AD 410, much of the lowlands of Britain to the east and south-east was overrun by various Germanic peoples, commonly known as Anglo-Saxons. Some have theorised that the cultural dominance of the Anglo-Saxons was due to apartheid-like social conditions in which the Britons were at a disadvantage. From the fifth century the Anglo-Saxon barbarians pushed to the north and the West and thus isolated the Celtic peoples of Wales from other Celts. At this stage Wales becomes a tangible territorial unit.The Welsh were also under attack from the Irish in the west and the Picts in the north. Cunedda Wledig, King of the Celtic Britons in Manaw Gododdin, moved to Gwynedd and established his kingdom there, expelling Irish settlers and consolidating the Brythonic language, the precursor to modern Welsh.

By AD 500 the land that would become Wales had divided into a number of kingdoms free from Anglo-Saxon rule. The kingdoms of Gwynedd, Powys, Dyfed and Seisyllwg, Morgannwg and Gwent emerged as independent Welsh successor states. Archaeological evidence, in the Low Countries and what was to become England, shows early Anglo-Saxon migration to Great Britain reversed between 500 and 550, which concurs with Frankish chronicles. John Davies notes this as consistent with the British victory at Badon Hill, attributed to Arthur by Nennius.During the sixth and seventh centuries, Anglo-Saxon pressure westwards caused a break in the link between Celts in modern-day Welsh territory and their Celtic compatriots in other areas outside Wales. The Celtic link with Cornwall was broken following Anglo-Saxons victory in Dyrham, Gloucestershire in 577 and from the Celts of Cumbria area (Hen Ogledd) in 616 after defeat at the battle of Chester. Settlers from Cornwall contributed the Celtic population of modern-day Brittany, which today has the same anthem tune as Wales.

The Germanic tribes who now dominated these lands were invariably called , meaning "Saxons". The Anglo-Saxons called the Romano-British , meaning 'Romanised foreigner' or 'stranger'.

From Brython to Cymro 
The poem, Moliant Cadwallon was written by the king's bard Afan Ferddig in c. 633. The early Middle Ages saw the creation and adoption of the modern Welsh name for themselves, Cymry, a word descended from Common Brittonic combrogi, meaning "fellow-countrymen". Cymry probably came into use as a self-description before the seventh century. Historically the word applies to both the Welsh and the Brythonic-speaking peoples of northern England and southern Scotland, the peoples of the Hen Ogledd, and emphasises a perception that the Welsh and the "Men of the North" were one people, exclusive of all others. Universal acceptance of the term as the preferred written one came slowly in Wales, eventually supplanting the earlier Brython or Brittones. The term was not applied to the Cornish people or the Bretons, who share a similar heritage, culture and language with the Welsh and the Men of the North. All of the Cymry shared a similar language, culture and heritage. Their histories are stories of warrior kings waging war, and they are intertwined in a way that is independent of physical location, in no way dissimilar to the way that the histories of neighbouring Gwynedd and Powys are intertwined. Kings of Gwynedd campaigned against Brythonic opponents in the north. Sometimes the kings of different kingdoms acted in concert, as is told in the literary Y Gododdin. Much of the early Welsh poetry and literature was written in the Old North by northern Cymry.

Welsh unity 

Although traditionally, the kingdoms of Wales were described as being continuously at war with each other, in reality they shared a history of peaceful and gradual unity via series of royal marriages and policy. Pressures of Viking attacks also led to increased unity and gathering under strong leaders. This "unifying" process began with Merfyn Frych, King of Gwynedd in the 9th century and his son Rhodri Mawr. Rhodri briefly united much of Wales under his rule, the likes of which had not been seen before.

A scholar from St Davids named Asser wrote in 893 that Offa of Mercia, the Anglo-Saxon king, had built Offa's Dyke to separate the Anglo-Saxons and the Celtic Britons. Offa, according to Dr Rebecca Thomas defined the territory of the Celtic Britons as Wales. The dyke established a compromise frontier with the Celts of Wales and a firm boundary of 149 miles from sea to sea for the first time in the Celts' history. It has been described as the most striking man-made boundary in western Europe.

In the 9th century, Nennius, a Welsh monk from Gwynedd, wrote a Latin text that including place names in both Welsh and English, in which he referred to the Welsh language as "our language".

Welsh Law 

By tradition, Welsh Law was compiled during an assembly held at Whitland around 930 by Hywel Dda, king of most of Wales between 942 and his death in 950.

According to Welsh historian John Davies, the law of Wales is "among the most splendid creations of the culture of the Welsh". Over the centuries, Welsh law was a powerful symbol of the unity and identity of the Welsh and was uniform in its essence across the whole of Wales. Cyfraith Hywel ("The Law of Hywel") as it became known, codified the previously existing folk laws and legal customs that had evolved in Wales over centuries. Welsh Law emphasised the payment of compensation for a crime to the victim, or the victim's kin, rather than punishment by the ruler. The law of Wales according to Dafydd Jenkins, contained elements of mercy, common sense and respect for women and children, which was lacking in the Law of England until very recently.

High to Late Middle ages

Unification 

Wales first appeared as a unified independent country in 1055 under the leadership of the only King of Wales to have controlled all the territories of Wales, Gruffydd ap Llywelyn until 1063. In 1055 Gruffydd ap Llywelyn killed his rival Gruffydd ap Rhydderch in battle and recaptured Deheubarth. Originally king of Gwynedd, by 1057 he was ruler of Wales and had annexed parts of England around the border. He ruled Wales with no internal battles His territories were again divided into the traditional kingdoms. John Davies states that  was "the only Welsh king ever to rule over the entire territory of Wales... For about seven brief years, Wales was one, under one ruler, a feat with neither precedent nor successor." Between 1053 and 1063, Wales lacked any internal strife and was at peace. Three years later the Norman invasion began which briefly controlled much of Wales, but by 1100 Anglo-Normans control was reduced to the lowland Gwent, Glamorgan, Gower, and Pembroke, regions which experienced considerable Anglo-Norman colonisation, while the contested border region between the Welsh princes and Anglo-Norman barons became known as the Welsh Marches.

Welsh Princes 
Owain Gwynedd (1100–70) of the Aberffraw line was the first Welsh ruler to use the title  (prince of the Welsh), a title of substance given his victory on the Berwyn Mountains, according to John Davies. It is broadly agreed by historians that the Welsh national identity existed by the 12th century.

Llywelyn ap Iorwerth (Llywelyn the Great) ruled Gwynedd unchallenged by 1208, annexed southern Powys and marched into Ceredigion. He was forced into humiliating terms with King John of England in 1211, but by 1212 became the dominant force in Deheubarth and took advantage of general Welsh resistance against conquest of Wales by an English king and Welsh princes agreed loyalty and bond of homage and fealty to Llywelyn. in 1216 he summoned Welsh princes to a kind of national Welsh parliament at Aberdyfi. In 1283 he again summoned all Welsh princes who swore loyalty to his son Dafydd at Strata Florida Abbey.

Gerallt Gymro (Gerald of Wales) describes an early definition of Welsh nationhood be describing the Welsh as community of people living in a defined territory, with common ancestry also seeking to defend the territory of Wales. The essence of the Welsh national identity was racial, cultural and social and from the time of Gerald there were aspirations to add a political sense of nationhood also. After 1200 there is evidence to suggest that the poets of Wales shifted to use the terms Cymro (Welshman) rather than Brython (Briton of Celtic origin).

In the 13th century, the last prince of Wales, Llywelyn the Last retained his rights to Wales in agreement with King Henry in the treaty of Montgomery in 1267. Henry's successor, Edward I disapproved of Llywelyn's alliance with Simon de Montfort, who revolted along with other barons against the English king in the second barons' war of 1264 to 1267 and so in 1276, Edward's army forced Llywelyn into an agreement that saw Llywelyn withdraw his powers to Gwynedd only. In 1282 whilst attempting to gather support in Cilmeri near Builth Wells, Llywelyn was killed by one of Edward's soldiers. Llywelyn's brother, Dafydd ap Gruffydd briefly led a force in Wales, but was captured and later hung drawn and quartered by Edward, thus ending Welsh independence.

Aftermath of conquest 
Following the conquest a poet asked “’Is it the end of the world?". A contemporary chronicler stated that "And then all Wales was cast to the ground.’” Professor Rees Davies suggests that the Welsh people continued to cultivate their own separate identity stating, “Wales remained a country because its people believed it to be a country.”

Following the conquest of the English king, the evolution of the Welsh nobles to the gentry meant that the poets of the time were commissioned by these "lesser nobles" and produced a body of Welsh literature which only strengthened Welsh self-awareness which then led to a series of Welsh revolts. The  Welsh clergy and the monks were keen to maintain the Welsh identity. The English authorities on the other hand were determined to remove the influence of Welsh cistercian communities.Following the English conquest, there were multiple Welsh rebellions against English rule. The last, and the most significant revolt was the Glyndŵr Rising of 1400–1415, which briefly restored independence. Owain Glyndŵr held the first Welsh parliament (Senedd) in Machynlleth in 1404 where he was proclaimed Prince of Wales and a second parliament in 1405 in Harlech. Following the eventual defeat of the Glyndŵr rebellion and a brief period of independence, it wasn't until 1999 that a Welsh legislative body was re-established as the National Assembly of Wales which was renamed Senedd Cymru/Welsh Parliament in 2020.

Early modern period 
A distinct Welsh identity continued in Wales through religion. Puritanism grew in Wales, particularly Methodism in the 18th century and the Welsh language was also associated  with it.

During the industrial period in Wales and in the 19th century, history became more important as a symbol of Welsh identity, as the Welsh language as the number of Welsh speakers decreased. Wales became a modern industrial nation but at the same time, the Welsh language became a minority language in Wales for the first time. The influx of English-speakers to South Wales in particular contributed to this.

Politically, Wales had strongly supported the Liberal party as well as the radical political movement. However, during most of the 20th century, support of the labour party and class solidarity became synonymous with Wales.

The Sunday Closing (Wales) Act 1881 was the first legislation to acknowledge that Wales had a separate politico-legal character from the rest of the English state.

Home rule movement 

Welsh nationalism for example emphasises the distinctiveness of Welsh language, culture, and history, and calls for more self-determination for Wales, which might include more devolved powers for the Senedd or full independence from the United Kingdom. While a sense of nationhood has existed within Wales for over 1500 years, the idea that Wales should be a modern self-determining state has only been mooted since the mid-18th century.

In 1886 Joseph Chamberlain proposed "Home Rule All Round" in the United Kingdom, and in the same year, the Cymru Fydd (Young Wales) movement was founded to further the cause. The main leaders were David Lloyd George (later Prime Minister), J. E. Lloyd, O. M. Edwards, T. E. Ellis (leader, MP for Merioneth, 1886–1899) and Beriah Gwynfe Evans. Its main objective was to gain self-government for Wales. Their goal was a devolved assembly, but the movement was disbanded in 1896 amid personal rivalries and rifts between Liberal representatives such as David Alfred Thomas.
By the end of the 1930s there was concern that a second world war could cause the disappearance of the Welsh national identity as well as the political party of Plaid Cymru.

Parliament for Wales 
In the 1950s, the deterioration of the British Empire removed a sense of Britishness and there was a realisation that Wales was not as prosperous as south-east England and smaller European countries. Successive Conservative Party victories in Westminster led to suggestions that only through self-government could Wales achieve a government reflecting the votes of a Welsh electorate. The Tryweryn flooding which was voted against by every single Welsh MP, suggested that Wales as a nation was powerless. The Epynt clearance in 1940 has also been described as a "significant - but often overlooked - chapter in the history of Wales".

On 1 July 1955, a conference of all parties was called at Llandrindod by the New Wales Union (Undeb Cymru Fydd) to consider a national petition for the campaign for a Parliament for Wales. The main leader was Megan Lloyd George, the daughter of David Lloyd George, T. I. Ellis, and Sir Ifan ab Owen Edwards. According to the historian Dr William Richard Philip George, "Megan was responsible for removing much prejudice against the idea of a parliament for Wales". She later presented the petition with 250,000 signatures to the British government in April 1956.

The Labour Party's 1959 commitment to appoint a Secretary of State for Wales, the creation of the Welsh Office in 1965, and the repeal of the Wales and Berwick Act 1746 two years later seemed to demonstrate a growing nationalist impetus.

Legal status of Wales 

The Welsh Language Act 1967 repealed a section of the Wales and Berwick Act and thus "Wales" was no longer part of the legal definition of England. This essentially defined Wales as a separate entity legally (but within the UK), for the first time since before the Laws in Wales Acts 1535 and 1542 which defined Wales as a part of the Kingdom of England. The Welsh Language Act 1967 also expanded areas where use of Welsh was permitted, including in some legal situations.

Devolution 

In a referendum in 1979, Wales voted against the creation of a Welsh assembly with an 80 per cent majority. In 1997, a second referendum on the same issue secured a very narrow majority (50.3 per cent). The National Assembly for Wales (Cynulliad Cenedlaethol Cymru) was set up in 1999 (under the Government of Wales Act 1998) with the power to determine how Wales' central government budget is spent and administered, although the UK Parliament reserved the right to set limits on its powers. Following the establishment of a devolved national assembly for Wales, the  governments of the United Kingdom and of Wales almost invariably defined Wales as a country. The Welsh Government says: "Wales is not a Principality. Although we are joined with England by land, and we are part of Great Britain, Wales is a country in its own right."

Further powers 
The Government of Wales Act 2006 (c 32) is an Act of the Parliament of the United Kingdom that reformed the National Assembly for Wales and allows further powers to be granted to it more easily. The Act creates a system of government with a separate executive drawn from and accountable to the legislature. Following a successful referendum in 2011 on extending the law making powers of the National Assembly it is now able to make laws, known as Acts of the Assembly, on all matters in devolved subject areas, without needing the UK Parliament's agreement.

In the 2016 referendum, Wales voted in support of leaving the European Union, although demographic differences became evident. According to Danny Dorling, professor of geography at the Oxford University, “If you look at the more genuinely Welsh areas, especially the Welsh-speaking ones, they did not want to leave the EU,” 

After the Senedd and Elections (Wales) Act 2020, the National Assembly was renamed "Senedd Cymru" (in Welsh) and the "Welsh Parliament" (in English) (also collectively referred to as the "Senedd"), which was seen as a better reflection of the body's expanded legislative powers.

Welsh independence 

The modern Welsh independence movement emerged during the mid-19th century, as did a movement for "home rule". Since 1999, Wales has been granted some legislative power as part of Welsh devolution from the UK parliament, and contemporary Welsh law within the English legal system. At present, the political parties Plaid Cymru, Propel, Gwlad, and the Wales Green Party support Welsh independence.

In 2016, YesCymru was launched. A non party-political campaign for an independent Wales which held its first rally in Cardiff in 2019.

Culture

Welsh Language 
The Welsh language has been described as the most potent symbol of Welsh national identity. The language is an Indo-European language of the Celtic family; the most closely related languages are Cornish and Breton. Most linguists believe that the Celtic languages arrived in Britain around 600 BCE. The Brythonic languages ceased to be spoken in of England and were replaced by the English language, which arrived in Wales around the end of the eighth century due to the defeat of the Kingdom of Powys.

The Bible translations into Welsh and Protestant Reformation, which encouraged use of the vernacular in religious services, helped the language survive after Welsh elites abandoned it in favour of English in the fifteenth and sixteenth centuries.

Successive Welsh language acts, in 1942, 1967 and 1993 improved the legal status of Welsh. The Welsh Language (Wales) Measure 2011 modernised the 1993 Welsh Language Act and gave Welsh an official status in Wales for the first time, a major landmark for the language. Welsh is the only official de jure language of any country in the UK. The Measure was also responsible for creating the post of Welsh Language Commissioner, replacing the Welsh Language Board. Following the referendum in 2011, the Official Languages Act became the first Welsh law to be created in 600 years, according to the First Minister at the time, Carwyn Jones. This law was passed by Welsh AMs only and made Welsh an official language of the National Assembly.

Starting in the 1960s, many road signs have been replaced by bilingual versions. Various public and private sector bodies have adopted bilingualism to a varying degree and (since 2011) Welsh is the only official language in any part of the United Kingdom.

Festivals and celebration

Saint David's Day 
Saint David's Day is a national celebration of Welsh culture. For centuries, 1 March has been a national festival. Saint David was recognised as a national patron saint in the 12th century at a peak time of Welsh resistance to the Normans. He was canonised by Pope Callixtus II in 1120. The 17th-century diarist Samuel Pepys noted how Welsh celebrations in London for Saint David's Day would spark wider counter-celebrations amongst their English neighbours: life-sized effigies of Welshmen were symbolically lynched, and by the 18th century the custom had arisen of confectioners producing "taffies"—gingerbread figures baked in the shape of a Welshman riding a goat—on Saint David's Day.

Eisteddfod 
In Welsh culture, an eisteddfod is a festival with several ranked competitions, including in poetry and music. Edwards further defines the earliest form of the eisteddfod as a competitive meeting between bards and minstrels, in which the winner was chosen by a noble or royal patron. The eisteddfod tradition in Wales originates from bardic tournaments of the 12th century. Thousands attend the August festival with rites, competitions and festivities celebrating the Welsh identity.

Symbols

Welsh Dragon 

The Welsh Dragon is a heraldic symbol that appears on the national flag of Wales. The oldest recorded use of the dragon to symbolise Wales is in the Historia Brittonum, written around AD 829, but it is popularly supposed to have been the battle standard of King Arthur and other ancient Celtic leaders. Its association with these leaders, along with other evidence from archaeology, literature, and documentary history, led many to suppose that it evolved from an earlier Romano-British national symbol.

The Flag of Wales incorporates the red dragon of King Cadwalader along with the Tudor colours of green and white.  The red dragon symbolises the original Celtic Britons (now Welsh) referenced in "Cyfranc Lludd a Lleuelys", Historia Brittonum, Historia Regum Britanniae, and the Welsh triads. Vortigern King of the Celtic Britons from Powys is interrupted whilst attempting to build fort at Dinas Emrys, and is told by Ambrosius or Merlin that he must dig up two dragons beneath. He discovers a red dragon representing the Celtic Britons and a white dragon representing Anglo-Saxons (now English). Ambrosius/Merlin prophecises that the Celtic Britons will reclaim the island and push the Anglo-Saxons back to the sea.

The first official flag of Wales was created in 1953 for the coronation of Queen Elizabeth II. This "augmented" flag including the Royal badge of Wales was criticised in 1958 by the "Gorsedd y Beirdd", a national Welsh group comprising Welsh literary figures and Welsh people of note. In 1959, likely in response to criticism, the Welsh flag was changed to a red Welsh dragon on a green and white background that remains the current flag of Wales today.

Glyndwr flag/arms 

The banner of Owain Glyndŵr is associated with Welsh nationhood. The banner of Owain Glyndŵr, was carried into battle by Welsh forces during Glyndŵr's battles against the English, includes four lions on red and gold. The standard is similar to the arms of Llywelyn ap Gruffudd (Llywelyn the Last), the last Prince of Wales before the conquest of Wales by Edward I of England. The design may also be influenced by the arms of Glyndwr's parents, both of whom had lions in their arms.

Daffodil and leek 
The daffodil and the leek are both symbols of Wales and are associated with Saint David's Day. The origins of the leek can be traced to the 16th century, while the daffodil became popular in the 19th century, encouraged by David Lloyd George. This is attributed to confusion 
(or association) between the Welsh for leek, cenhinen, and that for daffodil, cenhinen Bedr or St. Peter's leek.

Capital City 
On 21 December 1955, the Lord Mayor of Cardiff announced to a crowd that Cardiff was now the official capital of Wales following a parliamentary vote the previous day by Welsh local authority members. Cardiff won the vote with 136 votes compared to second-placed Caernarfon with 11. A campaign for Cardiff to become the capital city had been ongoing for 30 years prior to the vote. Historian James Cowan outlined some reasons why Cardiff was chosen which included; being the largest city in Wales with a population of 243,632, buildings in Cathays park such as City Hall and the National Museum of Wales among other reasons. Dr Martin Johnes, lecturer at Swansea University claims that Cardiff had become "a capital in a meaningful way, as the home of the Welsh government, whereas before, its capital status was irrelevant, it was just symbolic" prior to the formation of the devolved assembly of 1999.

Welsh love-spoon 
The "centuries old craft" and tradition of making Welsh lovespoons has been described as "a part of our identity".

Music

Anthems 
"Hen Wlad Fy Nhadau" is the unofficial national anthem of Wales. The words were written by Evan James and the tune composed by his son, James James, both residents of Pontypridd, Glamorgan, in January 1856. The earliest written copy survives and is part of the collections of the National Library of Wales.

The song "Yma o Hyd" has been described by its composer, Dafydd Iwan as a "very positive song" that celebrates the "survival of the language against all odds and the survival of a nation". The song cites the survival of Wales and the Welsh language for over 1,600 years, ever since Roman officer, Magnus Maximus left Wales and the island of Britain to become Emperor of the Western Roman Empire in 383 AD, and thus the year in which the modern country of Wales was born. Martin Johnes, professor of history at Swansea University has suggested that song is an anthem for “Welsh nationalists, Welsh-speaking culture and the industrial working class of Wales". "Wales was politically annexed in 1280; we haven't had a totally self-governing political unit since." The language was banned by Henry VIII of England in 1536 which lasted over 400 years, until 1942, and so “the survival of Welsh identity is pretty remarkable”.

Triple harp 

The triple harp is seen by a significant number of people as a symbol of Wales, with its struggle similar to that of Wales as well as the Welsh language in the last century.

Sport

Football 
The Wales national football team has been described as championing Welshness and is now seen as a symbol of Welsh culture and language.

Following the UEFA Euro 2016 tournament, the Wales national football team received a reception of a homecoming celebration. Wales were welcomed back home on 8 July with an open-top bus parade around Cardiff, starting at Cardiff Castle and going past the Millennium Stadium before finishing at the Cardiff City Stadium.

During the 2022 FIFA World Cup qualifying campaign, the symbolic song Yma o Hyd was sung live by Dafydd Iwan before kick-off of the penultimate qualifying game Austria with Wales winning 2–1. After beating Austria in the play-off semi-final, Wales qualified for the World Cup for the first time since 1958 with a 1–0 win over Ukraine at the Cardiff City Stadium on 5 June 2022. Yma o Hyd was again sang before the match and Gareth Bale, the Welsh captain also led the Welsh team in singing along with Iwan after the final whistle.

Rugby 

Rugby union and Wales' national team hold an important place in Welsh culture and society. Sport historian John Bale has stated that "rugby is characteristically Welsh", and David Andrew said that "To the popular consciousness, rugby is as Welsh as coal mining, male voice choirs, How Green Was My Valley, Dylan Thomas, and Tom Jones". Welsh rugby's first 'golden age' (1900–1911) coincided with the country's zenith during the 20th century, and rugby was important in building Wales' modern identity. There is a long tradition of Welsh supporters singing before and during matches. The choral tradition developed in Wales during the 19th century alongside the rise of nonconformity, and has extended to singing at rugby matches. Commonly sung songs include the hymn Cwm Rhondda, Tom Jones' Delilah, and Max Boyce's Hymns and Arias.

Politicising of Welsh national identity 
The Welsh national identity has become increasingly politicised in Wales since devolution. The sense of identity is not uniform across all Welsh political parties, which each party expressing their own version merged with political ideology.

A Plaid Cymru interviewee has suggested that Plaid Cymru is the only truly Welsh party. A Welsh Labour interviewee has suggested that being Welsh and Labour was a "natural" state. The Welsh Conservatives claim that they have had to work the most in order to provide an image of convincing "Welshness" to the Welsh electorate in order to overcome the historical image of the Welsh Conservatives as being both English and anti-Welsh.

A Welsh Labour senior assembly member has suggested that "Fifteen years ago, we had difficulty with the idea of Welsh Labour…those days are long gone…Welsh Labour probably now has a stronger Welsh identity than it has ever done" (7/11/2014). A Welsh conservative assembly member stated "The Conservative Party over the past fifteen, twenty years, has developed its Welsh branch…certainly since the establishment of the Assembly, it certainly has had to become more Welsh…" (18/8/14).

Geography & Archaeology 

Wales is part of the highland zone which has contributed to the identity of the country over many ages. Aspects that have shaped the uniqueness of Wales over the last 2000 years have also existed as far back as five to ten thousand years earlier. Geography and geology form the shape of Wales, and its culture has been researched by respected archaeologists.

Demographics 

 The 2011 census found that 57.5% identified as "Welsh only", 7.1% identified as "Welsh and British" and a combined proportion of people identifying as Welsh as 64.6%.
 A 2018 poll, commissioned by the BBC and carried out by YouGov, found that almost eight in 10 (79%) people in Wales identified strongly as British; while six in 10 (62%) identified strongly as Welsh.
 A 2019 BBC poll of a 1000 people in Wales found that at least 92% identified as Welsh. Of those questioned, 21% said they felt "Welsh not British", 27% said they felt "more Welsh than British" and 44% felt "equally British and Welsh" with the remaining 7% identifying as "more" or "exclusively British".
 The 2021 census showed that 55.2% identified as "Welsh only", 8.1% identified as "Welsh and British" and a combined proportion of people identifying as Welsh at 63.3%.
 The Welsh Annual Population Survey showed that the proportion of people who identified as Welsh versus another identity was 62.3% in 2022 compared to 69.2% in 2001.
 A 2022 YouGov poll found that 21% consider themselves Welsh not British, 15% more Welsh than British, 24% equally Welsh and British, 7% more British than Welsh and 20% British and not Welsh and 8% other. A total of 67% considered themselves Welsh to some degree.

Welsh election study

Multiple Option Polls

Census

By age (2014)

See also 
 Welsh people
 Culture of Wales
 History of Wales
 Politics of Wales
 Welsh language
 Welsh nationalism
 Welsh devolution
 Welsh independence
 Wales bucket hat

Notes

References 

National identity
National identity
National identity
History of nationality
National identities
Identity